Pine Ridge Airport  is a public use airport located two nautical miles (3.7 km) east of the central business district of Pine Ridge, in Oglala Lakota County, South Dakota, United States. The airport is owned by the Oglala Sioux Tribe, which has its tribal headquarters at Pine Ridge on the Pine Ridge Indian Reservation. According to the FAA's National Plan of Integrated Airport Systems for 2009–2013, it is categorized as a general aviation facility.

Although many U.S. airports use the same three-letter location identifier for the FAA and IATA, this facility is assigned IEN by the FAA and XPR by the IATA.

Facilities and aircraft 
It has two asphalt paved runways: 12/30 is 5,000 by 60 feet (1,524 x 18 m) and 6/24 is 3,003 by 50 feet (915 x 15 m). For the 12-month period ending May 12, 2008, the airport had 1,400 general aviation aircraft operations, an average of 116 per month.

References

External links 
 Pine Ridge (IEN) at South Dakota DOT Airport Directory
 Aerial image as of 10 October 1996 from USGS The National Map
 

Airports in South Dakota
Buildings and structures in Oglala Lakota County, South Dakota
Transportation in Oglala Lakota County, South Dakota
Native American airports